

The Bristol Type 99 Badminton was a 1920s British single-seat racing biplane built by the Bristol Aeroplane Company and designed by F.S. Barnwell.

Design and development
The Badminton was a single-seat single-engine equal-span biplane, it was made from wood and metal with fabric covering. It had a conventional tailskid landing gear and the nose-mounted engine was a 510 hp (380 kW) Bristol Jupiter VI.
Only one aircraft was built, registered G-EBMK, and it first flew at Filton Aerodrome on 5 May 1926. It was entered into the 1926 King's Cup Race but it forced-landed with a fuel feed problem. In 1927, the aircraft was rebuilt as the Type 99A with new wide-span tapered wings, a raised centre section and wide-chord interplane struts. It was powered by an uncowled (525 hp) (392 kW) Bristol Jupiter VI engine. It gained a certificate of airworthiness on 26 July 1927, but had a fatal crash at Filton two days later (28 July) after an engine failure on takeoff.

Variants
Type 99
1926 single-seat racing biplane, one built.
Type 99A
Type 99 modified in 1927.

Specifications (Type 99)

Notes

References

1920s British sport aircraft
Badminton
Racing aircraft
Aircraft first flown in 1926